The Alter Südfriedhof (Old South Cemetery) also known as "Alter Südlicher Friedhof" is a cemetery in Munich, Germany. It was founded by Duke Albrecht V as a plague cemetery in 1563 about half a kilometer south of the Sendlinger Gate between Thalkirchner and Pestalozzistraße.

History
The cemetery was established in 1563, during the reign of Albert V, Duke of Bavaria, for victims of the plague and located outside the city gates. It was also the burial ground of the dead from the Sendling uprising of 1705, in which over 1100 were killed after they had surrendered to the troops of Joseph I, Holy Roman Emperor. From 1788 to 1867 it was the single collective burial ground for the dead of the city.

Notable interments
From 1788 to 1868 it was the only cemetery for the whole metropolitan area of Munich, which is why it contains the graves of several prominent Munich figures of that period.
 Max Emanuel Ainmiller – painter, 1807–1870
 Franz Xaver von Baader – philosopher, 1765–1841
 Jakob Bauer – first mayor, 1787–1854
 Theodor von Bischoff – anatomist and physician, 1807–1882
 Gottlieb Bodmer – painter and lithographer, 1804–1837
 Roman Anton Boos – sculptor, 1730–1810
 Friedrich Brugger – sculptor (1815–1870)
 Friedrich Bürklein – architect, 1813–1872
 Adolf Christen – theatre director and producer, 1811–1883
 Anna Dandler – actress, 1862–1930
 Ernst Friedrich Diez – opera singer, 1805–1892
 Sophie Diez – opera singer, 1820–1887
 Johann Georg von Dillis – landscape painter, 1759–1841
 Ignaz von Döllinger – theologian, 1799–1890
 Johann Georg Edlinger – painter, 1741–1819
 Alexander Eibner – painter and painting tutor, 1862–1935
 Caspar Ett – composer, 1788–1847
 Jakob Philipp Fallmerayer – traveller, journalist, politician and historian, 1790–1861
 Carl von Fischer – architect, 1782–1820
 Ludwig Foltz – architect, sculptor and illustrator, 1809–1867
 Joseph von Fraunhofer – optician and inventor, 1787–1826
 Franz Xaver Gabelsberger – shorthand inventor, 1789–1849
 Friedrich von Gärtner – architect, 1792–1847
 Sebastian Gaigel – founder of the city orphanage, 1799–1871
 Joseph Görres – publicist, 1776–1848
 Charlotte von Hagn – actress (appears in the Gallery of Beauties), 1809–1891
 Johann von Halbig – sculptor, 1814–1882
 August von Hauner – teacher and professor, 1811–1884
 Peter von Hess – painter, 1792–1871
 Wilhelm von Kaulbach – history painter, 1805–1878
 Franz Xaver Kefer – educationalist and administrator, 1763–1802
 Leo von Klenze – architect, 1784–1864
 Franz von Kobell – mineralogist and Bavarian / Palatinate dialect poet, 1803–1882
 Alexander von Kotzebue – Russo-German battle-painter, 1815–1889
 Karl Christian Friedrich Krause – philosopher, 1781–1832
 Ludwig Lange – architect and painter, 1808–1868
 Georg Leib – Royal Councillor of Commerce and scaffolding specialist, 1846–1910
 Justus Freiherr von Liebig – chemist and natural scientist, 1803–1873
 Ferdinand von Miller – member of the Dt. Reichstag, 1813–1887
 Hermann Joseph Mitterer – art educator and administrator, 1762–1829
 Carl Friedrich Neumann – Sinologist, 1793–1870
 Eugen Napoleon Neureuther – painter, draughtsman and etcher, 1806–1882
 Johann Nepomuk von Nussbaum – surgeon, 1829–1890
 Georg Simon Ohm – physicist, 1789–1854
 Max von Pettenkofer – important physician, 1818–1901
 Ludwig von der Pfordten – Bavaria's Ministerpräsident, 1811–1880
 Christian Pram-Henningsen – Danish painter, 1846–1892
 Siegmund von Pranckh – general and Defence Minister, 1821–1888
 Georg Friedrich von Reichenbach – inventor and engineer, 1772–1826
 Josef Gabriel Rheinberger – composer and music teacher from Liechtenstein, 1839–1901
 Karl Rottmann – landscape painter, 1798–1830
 Eduard Schleich the Elder – painter, 1813–1874
 Friedrich Ludwig von Sckell – landscape gardener, 1750–1823
 Ludwig Schwanthaler – sculptor, 1802–1848
 Moritz von Schwind – painter, 1804–1871
 Helene Sedlmayr – symbol of Schönen Münchnerin in the Gallery of Beauties, 1813–1898
 Franz von Seitz – painter, lithographer and costume painter, 1817–1883
 Otto Seitz – painter and teacher, 1846–1912
 Alois Senefelder – inventor of lithography, 1771–1834
 Johann Nepomuk Sepp – historian and politician, 1816–1909
 Carl Spitzweg – painter and apothecary, 1808–1885
 Carl August von Steinheil – physicist, 1801–1870
 Alexander Strähuber or 'Straehuber' (1814–1882), history painter, book illustrator and art professor
 Friedrich Wilhelm von Thiersch – "Praeceptor Bavariae", 1784–1860
 Gustav Vorherr – architect, 1778–1847
 Franz Widnmann – painter and graphic artist, and professor 1846–1910
 Klara Ziegler – actress and theatre founder, 1844–1909
 Anton Zwengauer – landscape painter, 1810–1884

Current use
The cemetery today serves as an Art and Cultural history monument, and is open to the public as an official Munich park.  Most of the monuments, which suffered from exposure to weather and pollution, have been renovated and cleaned, in a three-year project (2004–2007).  The St. Stephan's church has also been renovated.

References

External links

 

1563 establishments in the Holy Roman Empire
Cemeteries in Munich
Protected areas of Bavaria
Tourist attractions in Munich
Parks and open spaces in Munich